Gubernatorial elections were held in the Democratic Republic of the Congo in March 2014.

The elections were initially scheduled for 2012, but were delayed until 2014.

Elections were held for nineteen provincial governors.  Fourteen of the elections were won by allies of President Joseph Kabila, and were considered to have shored up Kabila's position, particularly in terms of control over local defence forces.

Some leaders of the opposition claimed that the elections had been rigged.

References

2014
2014 elections in Africa
2014 in the Democratic Republic of the Congo
March 2014 events in Africa